Ganden Monastery (also Gaden or Gandain) or Ganden Namgyeling or Monastery of Gahlden is one of the "great three" Gelug university monasteries of Tibet. It is in Dagzê County, Lhasa. The other two are Sera Monastery and Drepung Monastery. Ganden Monastery was founded in 1409 by Je Tsongkhapa Lozang-dragpa, founder of the Gelug order. The monastery was destroyed after 1959, but has since been partially rebuilt. Another monastery with the same name and tradition was established in Southern India in 1966 by Tibetan exiles.

Location

The monastery lies in a hilly natural amphitheater. from the kora route around the monastery there are dramatic views over the valleys that surround it.
Ganden Monastery is at the top of Wangbur Mountain, Dagzê County at an altitude of 4,300m.
Its full name is Ganden Namgyal Ling (dga' ldan rmam rgyal gling). Ganden means "joyful" and is the Tibetan name for Tuṣita, the heaven where the bodhisattva Maitreya is said to reside. Namgyal Ling means "victorious temple".

History

Ganden Monastery was founded by Je Tsongkhapa Lozang-dragpa (1357–1419) in 1409.
Tsongkhapa built Ganden's main temple, with large statues and three-dimensional mandalas.
He often stayed at Ganden, and died there in 1419.
Tsongkhapa's preserved body was entombed at Ganden by his disciples in a silver and gold encrusted tomb.

The name "Gelug" is an abbreviation of "Ganden Lug", meaning "Ganden Tradition".
The Ganden Tripa or "throne-holder of Ganden" is the head of the Gelug school.
Before dying Tsongkhapa gave his robe and staff to the first Ganden Tripa, Gyeltsabjey (1364-1432), who was succeeded by Kaydrubjey.
The term of office is seven years, and by 2003 there had been 99 Ganden Tripas.
The monastery was divided into four colleges at the time of the 2nd Ganden Tripa. 
Later these were consolidated in two, Jangtsey and Shartsey, located respectively to the north and east of the main temple.
Both combine the study of sutra and tantra.
Study methods include memorization, logic and debate. The colleges grant degrees for different levels of achievement, evaluated by examination and formal public debate.

In the 1860s a meeting called "the great Ganden Monastery, Drepung Monastery, and the government officials" was organized by Shatra, a lay aristocrat. The existing regent was deposed by this assembly and replaced by Shatra.
From then on the assembly, or Tsondu, chose the regents and played a significant political role as a consultative body.
The monasteries of Ganden, Sera and Drepung was so great that they could in effect veto government decisions with which they disagreed.
These three monasteries had 20,000 monks in total, supported by large estates of fertile land worked by serfs.
At one time the Ganden monastery could support over 5,000 monks.
Laurence Waddell reports an estimate of about 3,300 in the 1890s.
There were apparently only 2,000 monks in 1959.

Post-1959 rebuilding 
Ganden Monastery was completely destroyed by the People's Liberation Army during the 1959 Tibetan uprising. In 1966 it was severely shelled by Red Guard artillery, and monks had to dismantle the remains. 
The buildings were reduced to rubble using dynamite during the Cultural Revolution (1966–1976).

Most of Tsongkhapa's mummified body was burned, but his skull and some ashes were saved from the fire by Bomi Rinpoche, the monk who had been forced to carry the body to the fire.

Re-building has continued since the 1980s. As of 2012, rapid progress was being made on rebuilding the monastery. The red-painted lhakang in the centre is the reconstruction of Ganden's sanctum sanctorum containing Tsongkapa's reliquary chorten, called the Tongwa Donden, "Meaningful to Behold."

Structures

Ganden contained more than two dozen major chapels with large Buddha statues. The largest chapel was capable of seating 3,500 monks. Tenzin Gyatso, the 14th Dalai Lama (born 1935), took his final degree examination in Ganden in 1958 and he claims to feel a particularly close connection with Tsongkhapa.
The monastery runs a guesthouse for visitors.
Ganden's main assembly hall is a white building with gold-capped roofs, near a huge square.
The main chapel contains many gilded images of Tsongkhapa. A maroon and ochre chapel beside the main assembly hall has a statue of Sakyamuni Buddha, and has a section used for hand-printing scriptural texts using wood blocks.

The three main sights in the Ganden Monastery are the Serdung, which contains the tomb of Tsongkhapa, the Tsokchen Assembly Hall and the Ngam Cho Khang the chapel where Tsongkhapa traditionally taught. The monastery houses artifacts that belonged to Tsongkhapa.

Recent events 
Early in 1996, after a ban had been imposed on pictures of the Dalai Lama, 400 monks at Ganden rioted. They were fired upon by PLA troops, apparently causing two deaths and several injuries, followed by the arrest of one hundred monks.

During the 2008 Tibetan uprising anniversary, Ganden Monastery monks participated in the mass demonstrations and protests which began on 10 March and spread throughout Tibet.
 
As of 2012 the population of monks has been reduced to about 400 monks.

Establishment in India

The Ganden Monastery has been re-established in Karnataka, India by the Tibetan population in exile. The Ganden Monastery is in the Tibetan settlement at Mundgod. This settlement of Tibetan refugees is the largest of its kind in India and was first established in 1966, from land donated by the Indian government.   
In the Tibetan settlement near Mundgod are the Ganden and the Drepung Monastery. In 1999 there were about 13,000 residents. The Tibetan settlement consists of nine camps with two monasteries and one nunnery. They established a credit bank for farms, an agricultural institute and a craft center. Modern technology and communication technology are being introduced. The curriculum of the Ganden Monastery remains similar to the teachings of the pre-1959 Ganden Monastery.
The Ganden Monastery Colleges Jangtse and Shartse have also been reestablished in India. They are named The Ganden Jangtse College and The Gaden Shartse Monastery. They are located in Karnataka.

In 2008, over 500 monks, who refused to adhere to the ban against the protective deity Dorje Shugden, enforced by the Dalai Lama's government in exile, were expelled from the Ganden Monastery in Mundgod, Karnataka, and founded in its immediate neighborhood the Shar Gaden Monastery, officially opened in October 2009. As a result, the Dokhang Khangtsen, the biggest division of Gaden Shartse Monastery, where most of the departing monks came from, ceased to exist.

See also
Ganden Phodrang

References

Sources

 Expanded to cover Tsenzhab Serkong Rinpoche II, September 2003

 Reprint of Tibetan Buddhism: With Its Mystic Cults, Symbolism and Mythology, first edition 1895

Buddhist monasteries in Lhasa (prefecture-level city)
Buddhist temples in Tibet
Dagzê County
Religious organizations established in the 1400s
1409 establishments in Asia
Gelug monasteries
Rebuilt buildings and structures in China
Major National Historical and Cultural Sites in Tibet
Tibetan Buddhist monasteries and temples in India